Freedom High School may refer to:

Freedom High School (Oakley, California) in Oakley, California
Freedom High School (Turlock, California) in Turlock, California
Freedom High School (Orlando, Florida) in Orlando, Florida
Freedom High School (Tampa, Florida) in Tampa, Florida
Freedom High School (New Mexico) in Albuquerque, New Mexico
Freedom High School (North Carolina) in Morganton, North Carolina
Freedom High School (Oklahoma) in Freedom, Oklahoma 
Freedom High School (Pennsylvania) in Bethlehem, Pennsylvania 
Freedom Area Senior High School, in Freedom, Pennsylvania
Freedom High School (Loudoun County, Virginia) in South Riding, Virginia 
Freedom High School (Woodbridge, Virginia) in Woodbridge, Virginia
Freedom High School (Wisconsin) in Freedom, Outagamie County, Wisconsin

Schools with similar names include:
Fannie Lou Hamer Freedom High School in Bronx, New York, New York